Olivewood Cemetery may refer to;

 Olivewood Cemetery in Houston, Texas
 Olivewood Memorial Park, a cemetery in Riverside, California